Four Compositions (Quartet) 1983 is an album by American saxophonist and composer Anthony Braxton recorded in 1983 for the Italian Black Saint label.

Reception 
The Allmusic review awarded the album 4 stars.

Track listing 
All compositions by Anthony Braxton.

 "Composition No. 105 a" – 20:02
 "Composition No. 69 M" – 7:14
 "Composition No. 69 O" – 8:43
 "Composition No. 69 Q" – 5:23
Recorded at Barigozzi Studio in Milano, Italy on March 9 & 10, 1983

Personnel 
Anthony Braxton – alto saxophone, soprano saxophone, clarinet
George E. Lewis – trombone
John Lindberg – bass
Gerry Hemingway – percussion

References 

Black Saint/Soul Note albums
Anthony Braxton albums
1983 albums